T.R.E.N.D.Y. -Paradise from 1997– is Mucc's third EP, released on June 24, 2015. It is also their first EP released through a major label. It was released in two different versions, the limited edition including a bonus DVD with live footage. The EP was written with the concept of combining styles from the 90's with modern elements. The limited edition also contains the hidden track "1997", a track that has since become a staple of their live shows. All of the tracks were debuted live before their release.

Track listing

Personnel
MUCC
Tatsuro – Vocals
Miya – Guitar, Backing Vocals
Yukke – Bass Guitar
SATOchi – Drums
Tetsuya Kanmuri – Guest Vocals on Track 7
ROACH – Guest Backing Vocals on Tracks 1, 2, 4 and 7
Taama
Kubocchi
Katsuya
Daisuke
SHO (TWISTED HARBOR TOWN) – Guest Backing Vocals on Tracks 1, 2, 4 and 7
H@L (ARTEMA) – Guest Backing Vocals on Tracks 1, 2, 4 and 7
AKi (SID) – Guest Backing Vocals on Track 7

Notes
All writing, arrangement and personnel credits taken from the album insert.

References

2015 EPs
Mucc albums
Sony Music Entertainment Japan EPs